Khutsong is a township on the West Rand of South Africa, and scene of widespread unrest starting in February 2006. It is situated close to the town of Carletonville, in the Merafong City Local Municipality of the Gauteng province. With a terrible history of violence and gangsterism, the main factors causing crime rates to spike up from 2011 until late 2019 are mainly high poverty rates, municipality mismanagement and corruption and the lack of employment/job creating opportunities. In 2017/18 thousands of mine workers lost their jobs due to mines shutting down.

Climate
Köppen-Geiger climate classification system classifies its climate as subtropical highland (Cwb). Summer days are generally warm or slightly hot, summer nights are mild, while winter days are warm and winter nights are cool. Most of the rain falls in summer.

Local events

Riots
Following the abolition of cross-border municipalities, the entire Merafong City Local Municipality which includes Khutsong, was transferred from the West Rand District Municipality in Gauteng Province to the Southern District Municipality in the North West Province. The residents of Khutsong objected to the transfer from wealthy Gauteng to the poorer North West. Only 123 votes were cast in the local government elections held on 1 March 2006.

Actions taken by residents included an application to the Pretoria High Court and violent incidents, including petrol bombing the homes of African National Congress candidates, blocking roads  and the destruction of municipal property.

One important element in the Khutsong issue relates to environmental security. The Khutsong community is physically located alongside some of the richest gold mines in the world. Recent research conducted by the Water Research Commission in South Africa has shown that heavy metal and radionuclide contamination is closely associated with rivers and wetlands downstream of major mining operations. The Khutsong community is located in such an aquatic ecosystem, so the environmental dimension to this conflict is an important and largely unexplored one.

On 27 April 2007 when President Thabo Mbeki was celebrating Freedom Day at Bhisho renewed riots reminiscent of those which occurred in Soweto on 16 June 1976 took place in the streets of Khutsong.

On 4 December 2008 it was announced that Khutsong and the rest of the Merafong Municipality would be reintegrated into the Gauteng Province. The passage of the Sixteenth Amendment to the Constitution of South Africa, altering the provincial boundaries accordingly, came into effect on 3 April 2009.

Vigilantism
On the 3 November 2013 number of vigilante mobs totalling around 700 people attacked alleged gang members across Khutsong.  Six people died in the attacks including five alleged gangsters and one sangoma believed to have been giving the gangsters muti and moral support.

It is reported that the event took place as a result of high levels of violent crime and the ongoing abduction of young girls as well and the recruitment of school children into the gangs.  Local community members tried to organise a meeting with the police but were unable to gain an audience with them.  After which they organised a meeting of their own to discuss the gang problem.  One of the largest of the local gangs, the Casanovas, then sought to break-up the meeting by sending over one hundred gang member to beat people at the meeting.  Twenty people were injured and this led to the community to regroup and vow revenge and the vigilante mob was formed. Arrests were never made.

See also
 COSATU
 SACP
 South African municipal election, 2006

Notes and references

External links
Inkatha Freedom Party - Mbeki must intervene at Khutsong
Gauteng government page on Khutsong
Government Notice on transfer of Merafong City Local Municipality
Merafong City Local Municipality page
Google News Link on Khutsong

Townships in Gauteng
Populated places in the Merafong City Local Municipality